The Commonwealth of Puerto Rico is an unincorporated territory of the United States in the Caribbean Sea.

Puerto Rico may also refer to:

Places
 Puerto Rico, Argentina, a city
 Puerto Rico, El Torno, Bolivia, a town
 Puerto Rico, Caquetá, Colombia, a town and municipality
 Puerto Rico, Meta, Colombia, a town and municipality
 Puerto Rico, Saipan, a village in the Northern Mariana Islands
 Puerto Rico de Gran Canaria, a holiday resort situated on the south-west coast of the Spanish island of Gran Canaria
 The original name for San Juan, Puerto Rico, the capital and largest city of the Commonwealth

Arts and entertainment
 Puerto Rico (board game), a German board game
 "Puerto Rico", the title of numerous songs, see List of songs about Puerto Rico
 Teatro Puerto Rico, a former music hall in the Bronx, New York City

Religion in the Commonwealth
 Diocese of Puerto Rico, part of the Roman Catholic Archdiocese of San Juan de Puerto Rico
 Anglican Episcopal Diocese of Puerto Rico

Ships
 , several United States Navy ships, one canceled
 , an American cargo ship

Sports in the Commonwealth
 Puerto Rico Open, a PGA Tour golf tournament
 Puerto Rico FC, a professional football club based in Bayamon, Puerto Rico
 Puerto Rico United, a Puerto Rican association football team based in Aguada, Puerto Rico

Other uses
 University of Puerto Rico, the main public university of the Commonwealth of Puerto Rico
 Puerto Rico Airport, Bolivia

See also
 Puerto Rico Convention Center, San Juan, Puerto Rico
 Puerto Rico de Gran Canaria, a resort in the Canary Islands
 Puerto Rico Trench, an oceanic trench on the Atlantic side of the Caribbean Islands
 Porto Rico (disambiguation)